Willema kumbona is a species of  butterfly in the family Hesperiidae. It was described by Evans in 1937. It is found in Cameroon and Nigeria.

References

Butterflies described in 1937
Heteropterinae